Dobje pri Lesičnem is a settlement in the Municipality of Šentjur, in eastern Slovenia. The settlement, and the entire municipality, are included in the Savinja Statistical Region, which is in the Slovenian portion of the historical Duchy of Styria.

Name
The name of the settlement was changed from Dobje to Dobje pri Lesičnem in 1953.

Church
The local church is dedicated to Saint Oswald and belongs to the Parish of Prevorje. It dates to the 15th century with major 19th-century rebuilding.

References

External links
Dobje pri Lesičnem at Geopedia

Populated places in the Municipality of Šentjur